Varian Medical Systems is an American radiation oncology treatments and software maker based in Palo Alto, California. Their medical devices include linear accelerators (LINACs) and software for treating cancer and other medical conditions with radiotherapy, radiosurgery, proton therapy, and brachytherapy.  The company supplies software for managing cancer clinics, radiotherapy centers, and medical oncology practices. Varian Medical Systems employs more than 7,100 people  at manufacturing sites in North America, Europe, and China and approximately 70 sites globally.

In August 2020, Siemens Healthineers announced plans to acquire Varian for $16.4 billion. The deal was completed on April 15, 2021. After the merger it will continue to operate independently and will retain its headquarters along with its 10,000 employees.

History
Varian was founded in 1948 as Varian Associates by Russell H. Varian, Sigurd F. Varian, William Webster Hansen, and Edward Ginzton to sell the Klystron, the first tube which could generate electromagnetic waves at microwave frequencies, and other electromagnetic equipment.

By 1999, Varian Associates had branched into semiconductor, vacuum tube, and medical device fields. On April 2, 1999 these divisions split to become Varian Semiconductor, Varian, Inc. and Varian Medical Systems.

In August 2020, Siemens Healthineers AG announced that it plans to acquire Varian Medical Systems in an all-stock deal valued at $16.4 billion. The deal was approved and completed on 15 April 2021. After the merger Varian will continue to operate independently and will retain its headquarters along with its 10,000 employees.

Acquired companies 
Varian Medical Systems has acquired other companies including Pan-Pacific Enterprises, ACCEL Instruments, Bio-Imaging Research, Inc. Sigma Micro Informatique Conseil, Argus Software, Dosetek Oy, Velocity Medical Solutions. and MeVis Medical Solutions AG.

In January 2018, the company announced the acquisition of Sirtex Medical for $1.3 billion.

In 2019, the company acquired CyberHeart, a privately-held company with intellectual property (IP) that covers the use of radiation in the heart (cardiac radioablation) and other forms of radiosurgery for cardiovascular disease.

Spin-off companies 

On January 30, 2017, spin-off of Varex Imaging Corporation (manufacturing of X-ray imaging products) from Varian Medical Systems had been successfully completed.

Products

Linear accelerators 
Varian manufactures a range of megavoltage LINACs with varying levels of features and complexity, for example different numbers of multileaf collimators or the ability to perform radiosurgery.

TrueBeam is a radiotherapy system.

The EDGE radiosurgery suite was launched in 2012. The first cancer centers to use the new system were the Champalimaud Foundation in Lisbon, Portugal and Henry Ford Health System in Detroit, Michigan.

Halcyon 
In 2017, Varian launched Halcyon. The system features unique dual-layer MLC that enables high modulation with low leakage for every field or arc. Halcyon is advertised to be intuitive, friendly and comfortable for clinical staff and patient alike. This is primarily done by automating several functions typically performed manually by radiographers, such as switching between treatment beams automatically. Additionally, Halcyon also features an automated machine performance check for daily LINAC quality assurance, which can speed up the checking of beam constancy and mechanical performance through the use of a phantom.

However, while Halcyon does boast improved automation and workflow improvements which allow for faster patient treatment, these extra automation tasks can make occasionally make it more difficult for medical physicists to perform detailed Quality Assurance on LINAC performance. Nevertheless, automation in both quality assurance and clinical operation generally make the LINAC easier to operate by checkers and radiation therapists.

Proton Therapy 
Varian manufactures the ProBeam Proton Therapy System, with current and planned installations at several sites globally. These are an all pencil-beam scanning proton therapy system utilizing IMPT (intensity modulated proton therapy), which was developed with PSI of Switzerland. Varian also develops medical software and radiology information system for proton treatment planning system.

Ethos Therapy 
On September 16, 2019, during the 2019 American Society for Radiation Oncology (ASTRO) annual meeting, being held Sept. 15-18 in Chicago, Varian announced Ethos therapy, an artificial intelligence (AI)-driven holistic solution designed to increase the capability, flexibility and efficiency of radiotherapy. This new solution is designed to deliver an entire adaptive treatment in a typical 15-minute timeslot, from patient setup through treatment delivery.

Litigation

Defamation case law
In 1999, Varian Medical Systems, Inc. sued a former employee for defamation after they posted numerous messages criticizing the company on the Internet.  The lawsuit led to the ruling of Varian v. Delfino by the California Supreme Court on the question whether a trial could proceed while denial of the defendant's anti-SLAPP motion was under appeal.  After the state supreme court ruled that a new trial would be necessary because of that technical concern, the case was settled on undisclosed terms.

University of Pittsburgh
On April 25, 2012, a US federal judge in Pittsburgh awarded attorney fees, costs, and doubled damages totaling $73.6 million to the University of Pittsburgh after the university won a suit on medical patent infringement grounds against Varian.

References

External links
 

Companies formerly listed on the New York Stock Exchange
Companies based in Palo Alto, California
Health care companies based in California
American companies established in 1948
Health care companies established in 1948
Medical technology companies of the United States
Private providers of NHS services
2021 mergers and acquisitions
Siemens
American subsidiaries of foreign companies